Stella Mary's College of Engineering is a private engineering college located in Azhikal, Kanyakumari District, India. The college was established in the year 2012 by Dr. Nazerath Charles, an entrepreneur and founder of Nova Educational Trust. The college offers both undergraduate and post-graduate courses in engineering. The College is accredited by National Assessment and Accreditation Council

Admissions
Admissions into all courses are done through merit and management basis. A certain percentage of seats go to the Anna University Single Window System (AU SWS) and gets filled as Merit and the remaining seats are filled through an exam followed by interview termed as management quota. This percentage may vary each year.

Courses
There are 5 courses offered in B.E/B.Tech and 1 in M.E
 B.E Civil Engineering
 B.E Mechanical Engineering
 B.E Computer Science Engineering
 B.E Electronics and Communication Engineering
 B.E Electrical and Electronics Engineering
 M.E Computer Science Engineering

Placement
The Placement Cell was established in 2013. The cell arranges campus interviews with organizations for placement of final year students, and arranges in-industry training for students. Campus placement training (HR, Technical, GD, Written Test) is given in the pre-final year for all eligible candidates.
The College has established industrial relationships with companies in India and Qatar.

Accommodation
The college has an on-campus guest house, boys' hostel and girls' hostel.

See also
List of engineering colleges in Tamil Nadu
Bapuji Memorial Higher Secondary School

References

External links
 Official Website

Engineering colleges in Tamil Nadu
Colleges affiliated to Anna University
Universities and colleges in Kanyakumari district
Educational institutions established in 2012
2012 establishments in Tamil Nadu